Joni A. Yoswein (born 1955) is an American politician from New York.

Life
She was born in 1955, the daughter of David J. Yoswein (died 1997). She graduated from SUNY Albany. She married Glenn C. Van Bramer.

She entered politics as a Democrat, and was an aide to Assemblyman Mel Miller for fourteen years. She rose to become Director of Operations of the Assembly while Miller was Speaker. She also was a delegate to the 1984 and 1988 Democratic National Conventions.

On January 28, 1992, she was elected to the New York State Assembly (44th D.), to fill the vacancy caused by the conviction of Mel Miller for a felony. She remained a member of the 189th New York State Legislature until the end of the year. In September 1992, after re-apportionment, she ran in the 44th District Democratic primary for re-nomination against James F. Brennan, the incumbent from the old 51st District, and was defeated. In November 1992, she ran on the Liberal ticket for re-election, but was defeated again by Brennan.

In 1993, she was an Assistant Commissioner of the New York City Department of Aging.

In 1994, she founded, and ever since has been President of, Yoswein New York, a public affairs consulting firm.

Assemblyman and Supreme Court Justice Leonard E. Yoswein (1920–2011) was her uncle.

References

1955 births
Living people
Politicians from Brooklyn
Democratic Party members of the New York State Assembly
University at Albany, SUNY alumni
Women state legislators in New York (state)
20th-century American women politicians
20th-century American politicians
21st-century American women